Notes to You is a 1941 Warner Bros. Looney Tunes cartoon directed by Friz Freleng. The short was released on September 20, 1941, and stars Porky Pig.

This cartoon was remade in 1948, as Back Alley Oproar, with Elmer Fudd in Porky's role and Sylvester as the musical cat.

Along with All This and Rabbit Stew, the film was completed and shipped on September 2, 1941.

Plot 

When Porky tries to go to sleep, a cat starts singing Largo al factotum from The Barber of Seville in his back yard. Porky then starts throwing objects at the cat and finally hits him with a vase. The cat starts singing When Irish Eyes Are Smiling at Porky, and Porky throws a book at him, causing the cat to yowl in pain. Porky attempts to return to bed only for the cat to throw the book back and continue the song, as Porky closes the window in retaliation. Porky's phone rings and he answers it; the caller is revealed to be the cat finishing the song. Furious, Porky grabs a shotgun and claims "D-uh-d-uh-darn that old cat, I'll fix him this time once and for all!" and lays a saucer of milk on the porch. Porky then falls asleep as the cat drinks the milk and wakes Porky up by banging on the saucer.

Porky then chases the cat with the shotgun until the cat sings Rock-a-Bye Baby, which puts Porky to sleep. The cat then wakes Porky up by conducting the loud music playing on the radio (Frat by John F. Barth), before running out and singing The Umbrella Man, an American hit recorded in 1938 by Kay Kyser's dance orchestra. Porky locks down the window, but the cat reopens the door and sings Jeepers Creepers. Porky chases him out again, only for the cat to slam the door open into Porky before shutting it behind him. When the cat is outside singing Make Love With a Guitar, Porky grabs his gun and shoots the cat, who manages to gasp out a chorus of Aloha 'Oe, and dies. As Porky feels guilt over the cat's death, he's startled to hear the cat's nine lives outside his window singing the Sextet from the opera Lucia di Lammermoor.

As the picture irises out, a crash is heard (presumably, Porky, at his wits' end, jumped out of the window).

Home media
This cartoon has been presented in its 1968 colorized form on many public domain video compilations, such as the 2004 Digiview Entertainment DVD release of Porky's Café (where its image was grayscaled to look more like the original version).

It was released in its original black and white form in 1999 on a Columbia House Looney Tunes Collector's Edition VHS Tape entitled Musical Masterpieces. The original black-and-white print, fully remastered and uncut, was included on the Porky Pig 101 DVD officially released by Warner Archive on September 19, 2017.

References

External links 
 
  in black & white
 Notes to You colorized on Dailymotion

1941 films
1941 animated films
American black-and-white films
Short films directed by Friz Freleng
Looney Tunes shorts
1940s American animated films
Porky Pig films
Films about pigs
Animated films about cats
Films scored by Carl Stalling
Films with screenplays by Michael Maltese